Dominic Ralph Campden Lawson (born 17 December 1956) is a British journalist.

Background
Lawson was born to a Jewish family, the elder son of Conservative politician Nigel Lawson and his first wife socialite Vanessa Salmon. Lawson was educated at Eton College (for one year, which he "absolutely hated"), completing his schooling at Westminster School and proceeding to study History at Christ Church, Oxford. Lawson had three sisters: the TV chef and writer Nigella Lawson; Horatia; and Thomasina (who died of breast cancer in 1993 in her early 30s). Their mother, an heir to the Lyons Corner House empire, died from liver cancer in 1985. Lawson's father was Chancellor of the Exchequer between 1983 and 1989.

Lawson was married to Jane Whytehead from 1982 until 1991.

He has been married to Rosa Monckton, a Roman Catholic, the daughter of the 2nd Viscount Monckton of Brenchley, since 1991. The Lawsons have two daughters (another daughter, Natalia, was stillborn), Domenica Marianna Tertia and Savannah Vanessa Lucia; Domenica, who is a goddaughter of Diana, Princess of Wales was born with Down syndrome.

Career
Lawson joined the BBC as a researcher, and then wrote for the Financial Times. From 1990 until 1995 he was editor of The Spectator magazine, a post his father had occupied from 1966 to 1970. In his capacity as editor of The Spectator he conducted, in June 1990, an interview with the cabinet minister Nicholas Ridley in which Ridley expressed opinions immensely hostile to Germany and the European Community, likening the initiatives of Jacques Delors and others to those of Hitler. Lawson added to the damage caused, by claiming that the opinions expressed by Ridley were shared by the Prime Minister, Margaret Thatcher. Ridley was forced to resign from the cabinet shortly after this incident. Although some senior Tories called for Lawson to be fired, his proprietor, Conrad Black, stood by him. Under Lawson's five-year editorship, the magazine's circulation grew from 30,000 to 50,000.

From 1995 until 2005, Lawson was editor of The Sunday Telegraph. In 2006, he started to write columns for The Independent newspaper and in 2008, he became the main columnist for The Sunday Times. In his article for The Independent dated 2 September 2013, he wrote that it would be his last for that newspaper, although he did not give a reason.

He is a strong chess player and is the author of The Inner Game, on the inside story of the 1993 World Chess Championship. He was also involved in the organisation of the 1983 World Chess championship semi-final. Lawson writes a monthly chess column in Standpoint. In 2014 he was elected president of the English Chess Federation.

Richard Tomlinson wrote in 2001 that Lawson had worked with the intelligence agency MI6, but Lawson denied being an agent. Boris Johnson, then editor of The Spectator, wrote a pseudonymous article on the subject which Lawson (then editor of The Sunday Telegraph) found "intensely annoying" because of the potential increase in the threat to his newspaper's foreign correspondents. However, in 1998, Lawson acknowledged that articles written in 1994, under a false name with a Sarajevo dateline while he was editor of the Spectator magazine, were "probably" written by an MI6 officer.

In 2016, Lawson attributed the result of the United Kingdom European Union membership referendum to the legalisation of same-sex marriage.

References

Publications 
 Lawson, Dominic, The Inner Game, Hardinge Simpole Limited, 2008, 
 Diamond, John, Dawkins, Richard (Foreword), Dominic Lawson (Editor), Snake Oil and Other Preoccupations, Vintage, 2001, 
 Lawson, Dominic, End Game: Kasparov vs. Short, Harmony, 1994,

External links

1956 births
Living people
People from Wandsworth
People educated at Eton College
People educated at Westminster School, London
Alumni of Christ Church, Oxford
English Jews
Journalists from London
English male journalists
British chess writers
Financial Times people
The Independent people
The Sunday Times people
The Spectator editors
Salmon family
Sons of life peers